The Cathedral Church of Saint Michael, commonly known as Coventry Cathedral, is the seat of the Bishop of Coventry and the Diocese of Coventry within the Church of England. The cathedral is located in Coventry, West Midlands, England. The current bishop is Christopher Cocksworth and the current dean is John Witcombe.

The city has had three cathedrals. The first was St Mary's, a monastic building, from 1102-1539,  of which only a few ruins remain. The second was St Michael's, a 14th-century Gothic church designated as a cathedral in 1918, which remains a ruined shell after its bombing during the Second World War. The third is the new St Michael's Cathedral, built immediately adjacent after the destruction of the former, consecrated in 1962.

The ruined cathedral is a symbol of war time destruction and barbarity, but also of peace and reconciliation.

St Mary's Priory

Coventry had a medieval cathedral that survived until the Reformation. This was St Mary's Priory and Cathedral, 1095 to 1102, when Robert de Limesey moved the bishop's see from Lichfield to Coventry, until 1539 when it fell victim to Henry VIII's dissolution of the monasteries. Leofric was probably buried within the original Saxon church in Coventry. However, records suggest that Godiva was buried at Evesham Abbey, alongside her father confessor, Prior Æfic. It was the only medieval cathedral to be demolished at the Reformation.

St Michael's Cathedral

First structure

St Michael's Church was largely constructed between the late 14th century and early 15th century from red sandstone. It was one of the largest parish churches in England when, in 1918, it was elevated to cathedral status on the creation of the Diocese of Coventry.  This St Michael's Cathedral now stands ruined, bombed almost to destruction during the Coventry Blitz of 14 November 1940 by the German Luftwaffe. Only the tower, spire, the outer wall and the bronze effigy and tomb of its first bishop, Huyshe Yeatman-Biggs, survived. The ruins of this older cathedral remain hallowed ground and are listed at Grade I. Following the bombing of the cathedral in 1940, Provost Richard Howard had the words "Father Forgive" inscribed on the wall behind the altar of the ruined building. The spire rises to 284 feet (87 metres) to the base of the weathervane, and is the tallest structure in the city. It is also the third tallest cathedral spire in England, with only Salisbury and Norwich cathedrals rising higher. When the height of the weathervane is included, it is 290 feet (88 metres) high.

Present structure
The current St Michael's Cathedral, built next to the remains of the old one, was designed by Basil Spence and Arup, built by John Laing and is a Grade I listed building.

The selection of Spence for the work was a result of a competition held in 1950 to find an architect for the new Coventry Cathedral; his design was chosen from over two hundred submitted. Spence (later knighted for this work) insisted that instead of rebuilding the old cathedral, it should be kept in ruins as a garden of remembrance and that the new cathedral should be built alongside, the two buildings together effectively forming one church.  The use of Great Gate sandstone for the new Coventry Cathedral provides an element of unity between the buildings.

The foundation stone of the new cathedral was laid by Elizabeth II on 23 March 1956.

The cathedral was consecrated on 25 May 1962 by Cuthbert Bardsley, Bishop of Coventry with  Benjamin Britten's War Requiem, composed for the occasion, premiered in the new cathedral on 30 May to mark its consecration.

Coventry's new cathedral adopted a modernist design. The interior is notable for its huge tapestry (once thought to be the world's largest) of Christ, designed by Graham Sutherland, the emotive sculpture of the Mater Dolorosa by John Bridgeman in the East end, and the Baptistry window designed by John Piper (made by Patrick Reyntiens), of abstract design that occupies the full height of the bowed baptistery, which comprises 195 panes, ranging from white to deep colours. The stained glass windows in the Nave, by Lawrence Lee, Keith New and Geoffrey Clarke, face away from the congregation. Spence's concept for these Nave windows was that the opposite pairs would represent a pattern of growth from birth to old age, culminating in heavenly glory nearest the altar—one side representing Human, the other side, the Divine. Also worthy of note is the Great West Window known as the Screen of Saints and Angels, engraved directly onto the screen in expressionist style by John Hutton. A pane of the Hutton window, depicting The Angel with the Eternal Gospel, was smashed during a burglary in January 2020. (Although referred to as the West Window, this is the 'liturgical west' opposite the altar which is traditionally at the east end. In this cathedral the altar is actually at the north end.) The foundation stone, the ten stone panels inset into the walls of the cathedral called the Tablets of the Word, and the baptismal font were designed and carved by the émigré German letter carver Ralph Beyer. The lectern has a bookrest in the form of an eagle, by the sculptor Elisabeth Frink. She also designed the canopy for the Bishop's throne.

Theological emphasis

As the cathedral was built on the site of a Benedictine monastery, there has always been a Benedictine influence on the cathedral community. A number of the cathedral staff become third order (lay) Benedictines and there are often cathedral retreats to Mucknell Abbey. Since the opening of the new cathedral in 1962 there has been an evangelical emphasis. This has been strengthened by the former Dean, John Irvine, who was involved in creating the Alpha Course and previously served at Holy Trinity Brompton, and also as vicar of the first Brompton church plant, St Barnabas, Kensington. The cathedral has a strong emphasis on the Bible and aims to be a centre for good preaching and training for the diocese. It runs regular mission events such as the innovative Spirit of Life days where over 2,000 local residents are encouraged to explore their faith in God through Christian spirituality.

The cathedral is also known for innovation in its services. As well as the expected traditional services (on Sundays, eucharist at 10:30 am and choral evensong at 4 pm), there is a 6 pm Sunday service with contemporary music, preaching and prayer ministry. The Cathedral Youth Work runs Goth church and Urban Church outreach congregations for local groups of young people, an equipping and supporting cell group for youth workers within Coventry churches as well as a number of other regular groups. There continues to be a strong influence of reconciliation within the theology (both vertical: reconciling people to God; and horizontal: reconciling individuals and groups). This is present throughout the ministry of the cathedral but is most clearly seen in the International Centre for Reconciliation and the International Network of Communities of the Cross of Nails. The reconciliation work exists locally in reconciling churches and community groups but also internationally (predominantly in the Middle East and central Africa) working with terrorists and dictators as well as local churches, tribes and gangs.

Justin Welby (then a canon of the cathedral) established a special day for bereaved parents in the cathedral after the death of his own daughter. There is now an annual service commemorating the lives of children who have died. A book with the names of dead children is on display in the cathedral and anyone whose child has died under any circumstances can ask for their child's name to be added to the book.

Symbols of reconciliation
The old cathedral grounds are home to a number of symbols of reconciliation, to complement the church's mission. At first, however, the cathedral and its symbols represented the war time destruction and barbarity.

The Charred Cross

The Charred Cross was created after the cathedral was bombed during the Coventry Blitz of the Second World War. The cathedral stonemason, Jock Forbes, saw two wooden beams lying in the shape of a cross and tied them together. A replica of the Charred Cross built in 1964 has replaced the original in the ruins of the old cathedral on an altar of rubble. The original is now kept on the stairs linking the cathedral with St Michael's Hall below.

The Cross of Nails

The Cross of Nails, also created after the Blitz, was made of three nails from the roof truss of the old cathedral by Provost Richard Howard of Coventry Cathedral at the suggestion of a young friend, the Reverend Arthur Philip Wales. It was later transferred to the new cathedral, where it sits in the centre of the altar cross. It has become a symbol of peace and reconciliation across the world. There are over 330 Cross of Nails Centres all over the world, all of them bearing a cross made of three nails from the ruins, similar to the original one. When there were no more of these nails, a continuing supply have come from a prison in Germany. They are coordinated by the International Centre for Reconciliation.

One of the crosses made of nails from the old cathedral was donated to the Kaiser Wilhelm Memorial Church in Berlin, which was destroyed by Allied bombing and is also kept as a ruin alongside a newer building. A replica of the cross of nails was also donated to the Chapel of Reconciliation (Kapelle der Versöhnung) which forms part of the Berlin Wall Memorial.

A medieval cross of nails has also been carried on board all British warships which subsequently bear the name . The cross of nails was on board the Type 42 destroyer  when she was sunk by enemy action in the Falklands War. The cross was salvaged by Royal Navy divers, and presented to Coventry Cathedral by the ship's Captain and colleagues.

The Stalingrad Madonna 
A copy of the Stalingrad Madonna by Kurt Reuber that was drawn in 1942 in Stalingrad (now Volgograd) is shown in the cathedrals of all three cities (Berlin, Coventry and Volgograd) as a sign of the reconciliation of the three countries that were once enemies.

The statue of Reconciliation

In 1994 the cathedral received a copy of the statue Reconciliation, by Josefina de Vasconcellos. Originally created in 1977 and entitled Reunion, it had been presented to the University of Bradford's Peace Studies department. After repairs and renaming, a bronze cast of the statue was presented to the cathedral in 1995, to mark the 50th anniversary of the end of World War II. Similar copies are held at the Hiroshima Peace Park in Japan, at the Stormont Estate in Northern Ireland, and at the Chapel of Reconciliation in Berlin.

The BBC broadcast a documentary in 1962 entitled Act of Faith, narrated by Leo Genn, detailing the history of Coventry Cathedral, its destruction and rebuilding.

Music

The precentor of the new Coventry Cathedral at the opening service was Joseph Poole. The service was televised and watched by many.

Organ
The cathedral has a pipe organ by Harrison & Harrison dating from 1962, which is recognised as one of the finest in the UK. A specification of the organ can be found on the National Pipe Organ Register.

Directors of music

Assistant organists

 Allan Hawthorne-Baker 1934–1939
 Michael Burnett
 Robert George Weddle 1964–1972 (then organist)
 J. Richard Lowry 1972–1976
 Ian Little 1976–1977 (then organist)
 Paul Leddington Wright 1977–84 (then organist)
 Timothy Hone (1984-87)
 Chris Argent (1987-1990)
 David Poulter 1990–1995 (then director of music)
 Daniel Moult 1995–2002
 Martyn Lane
 Alistair Reid 2004–2011
 Laurence Lyndon-Jones 2011–2013
 Rachel Mahon 2018–2020 
 Luke Fitzgerald 2021-

Dean and chapter
As of 1 December 2020:

 Dean: John Witcombe (since 19 January 2013)
 Canon Precentor and Sub-Dean: David Stone (canon since 5 September 2010; sub-dean since April 2014)
 Canon Pastor: Kathryn Fleming (since 31 May 2014)
 Canon for Art and Reconciliation: Mary Gregory

Burials
 Gerard la Pucelle, Bishop of Coventry (1183–1184)
 Huyshe Yeatman-Biggs, Bishop of Coventry (1918–1922): a bronze effigy of him, commissioned by Hamo Thornycroft, was the only artefact to survive the bombing of the old Coventry Cathedral in 1940

Gallery

See also
 Bishop of Coventry Chronological list of Bishops from 1918 to present.
 Dean of Coventry Chronological list of Provosts and Deans
 List of cathedrals in the United Kingdom
 List of tallest structures built before the 20th century
 Grade I listed buildings in Coventry
 Kaiser Wilhelm Memorial Church, its German counterpart in Berlin
 Coventry Chronicle

References

External links

 Coventry Cathedral official website
 Further reading about Coventry's three Cathedrals
 Virtual tour of both the new cathedral and the ruins
 The Cross of Nails website 
 Flickr images tagged Coventry Cathedral
 Details of the organ from the National Pipe Organ Register
 Photograph of interior prior to destruction
 "Like a Phoenix from the Ashes: The Medieval Stained Glass of Coventry Cathedral"—Vidimus article about the cathedral's medieval stained glass

 
Coventry
Basil Spence buildings
British churches bombed by the Luftwaffe
Buildings and structures in Coventry
Buildings and structures in the United Kingdom destroyed during World War II
Buildings and structures in the West Midlands (county)
Churches completed in 1962
Churches in Coventry
Demolished buildings and structures in England
Diocese of Coventry
Grade I listed cathedrals
Grade I listed churches in the West Midlands (county)
Ruins of churches destroyed during World War II
Ruins in the West Midlands (county)
Tourist attractions in Coventry